Wadia Institute of Himalayan Geology, Dehradun is an autonomous Natural Resources research institute for the study of Geology of the Himalaya under the Department of Science and Technology, Ministry of Science and Technology, Government of India. It was established in June, 1968 in the Botany Department, Delhi University, the Institute was shifted to Dehradun, Uttarakhand during April, 1976.

The institute also has three field search stations, at Naddi-Dharamshala, Dokriani Bamak Glacier Station and at Itanagar in Arunachal Pradesh.

Anil Kumar Gupta was the director from 2010-2017

History
The institute has its origins in department of Geology at University of Delhi, after being shifted to Dehradun it was initially named as the Institute of Himalayan Geology, renamed in 1976 as the Wadia Institute of Himalayan Geology in memory of its founder, late Prof. Darashaw Nosherwan Wadia (F.R.S. and National Professor), in honor to his contributions to the geology of the Himalayas. During the last quarter century the Institute has grown as a centre of excellence in the field Himalayan Geology and is recognised as a National Laboratory of international repute with advanced laboratories and other infrastructural facilities for undertaking higher level of research in the country.

S.P. Nautiyal Museum
The museum offers a glimpse of the mighty Himalaya; its origin, evolution in time and space, natural resources, life in the geological past, earthquakes and environmental aspects. Basic objective in organising the museum is to educate students and general public as well as to highlight the Institute activities.
Museum, the educative wing of the Institute had a large number of student visitors from different universities, local schools and general public and as usual remained the main centre of attraction for the national and international visitors. Students in large groups from different schools, universities, colleges and from other institutions visited the Museum and guided tours were provided to them. A relief model of the Himalaya and paintings depicting the impact of human activities on the environment displayed in the Museum remained a point of attraction for the visitors. Also, over the years visitors from USA, Austria, U.K, Ukraine, Thailand, Australia, England, Japan, Nepal, France, Russia, Moscow, Israel and Canada visited the Museum.

Center for Glaciology
The Centre for Himalayan Glaciology was inaugurated by the Hon'ble Minister for Science and Technology and Earth Sciences, Shri Prithviraj Chavan on 4 July 2009 in the benign presence of the Secretary, DST, Dr. T. Ramasami and Joint Secretary, Shri Sanjiv Nair.
The primary mission of the Centre is to "Mount a coordinated research initiative on Himalayan glaciology to understand the factors controlling the effects of climate on glaciers in order to develop strategies for climate change adaptability for sustained growth of society". In addition, the Centre shall take up programmes of capacity building in this very specialized field, which will eventually nurture the independent Indian Institute of Glaciology.

Student Programmes/Fellowships
Fellowships
Institute Fellowships:
The Institute provides two categories of Institute Fellowships every year:
a) Junior Research Fellowship
b) Institute Research Associate
 Project Fellowship
Project assistantships are advertised as and when vacancies in Institute projects or externally funded projects arise.

Consultancy & Advisory Services
The Wadia Institute of Himalayan Geology provides consultancy and advisory services on small scale to various organisations for purpose of road alignment, site selection for bridges and their foundation, slope stability and control of landslides, site selection for deep tubewells, geotechnical feasibility of major and minor hydel projects and related structures, passenger and haulage ropeways, seismotectonics of hydel projects and environmental feasibility of developmental projects etc.

See also
 Department of Science and Technology (India)
 Indian Institute of Technology Roorkee
 Indian Institute of Petroleum, Dehradun

References

External links

Research institutes in Dehradun
Ministry of Science and Technology (India)
Geology of the Himalaya
Geology organizations
Earth science research institutes
1968 establishments in Delhi
Research institutes established in 1968
Glaciology